Karla Paola Riley Serracín (born 18 September 1997) is a Panamanian footballer who plays as a forward for Liga MX Femenil club Cruz Azul and the Panama women's national team. She is nicknamed La emperatriz del gol (The empress of the goal).

International goals
Scores and results list Panama's goal tally first

See also
 List of Panama women's international footballers

References

External links

1997 births
Living people
Sportspeople from Panama City
Panamanian women's footballers
Women's association football forwards
Santa Teresa CD players
Tauro F.C. players
Cruz Azul (women) footballers
Segunda Federación (women) players
Panama women's international footballers
Pan American Games competitors for Panama
Footballers at the 2019 Pan American Games
Panamanian expatriate women's footballers
Panamanian expatriate sportspeople in Spain
Expatriate women's footballers in Spain
Panamanian expatriate sportspeople in Mexico
Expatriate women's footballers in Mexico